The 1941–42 United States collegiate men's ice hockey season was the 48th season of collegiate ice hockey in the United States.

Regular season

Season tournaments

Standings

References

1941–42 NCAA Standings

External links
College Hockey Historical Archives

 
College